John Brereton (c. 1571–c. 1632) was an English gentleman adventurer and chronicler.

John Brereton may also refer to:
 John Brereton, 4th Baron Brereton (1659–1718), English baron in the peerage of Ireland
 John Le Gay Brereton (1871–1933), Australian poet
 John Brereton (footballer) (1935–2021), Australian footballer
 John Brereton (Irish lawyer) (1576–1629), English-born lawyer